The 1990 United States Senate election in Iowa was held on November 5, 1990. Incumbent Democratic U.S. Senator Tom Harkin sought re-election to a second term in office. Harkin was opposed by Republican U.S. Congressman Tom Tauke, from Iowa's 2nd congressional district, and both Harkin and Tauke won their primaries uncontested. Though Harkin performed slightly worse than he had six years earlier, he was successful in his re-election bid and defeated Tauke.

Democratic primary

Candidates 
 Tom Harkin, incumbent United States Senator

Results

Republican primary

Candidates 
 Tom Tauke, U.S. Representative

Results

General election

Results

See also 
 1990 United States Senate elections

References 

Iowa
1990
1990 Iowa elections